Sigma 7 may refer to:
 the callsign of the spacecraft used in the 1962 Mercury-Atlas 8 mission
 the SDS Sigma 7 computer, made by Scientific Data Systems (SDS), later known as Xerox Data Systems (XDS)
 Sigma Seven, a Japanese company
 Sigma 7 (video game), 1987 computer game by Durell Software
 Sigma 7 AC servo drive series from Yaskawa Electric Corporation